The Burton Memorial Tower is a clock tower located on Central Campus at the University of Michigan in Ann Arbor at 230 North Ingalls Street. Housing a grand carillon, the tower was built in 1936 as a memorial for University President Marion Leroy Burton (presidency: 1920–1925). This carillon is the world's fourth-heaviest, containing 53 bells and weighing a total of 43 tons.

History
The monument was constructed in 1935 and finished in 1936. It stands at 192 feet, with the floor of the bell chamber at 120 feet from the ground. It is located at the University of Michigan campus, and is used for housing education offices. The high-rise tower was designed in an interesting mixture of Art Deco and art moderne architectural styles, constructed with a reinforced concrete shell faced with limestone over a plan  square. The design was greatly influenced by Eliel Saarinen, who had submitted an earlier scheme. At the top is the 43-ton, 53-bell Baird Carillon. The tower chimes the Westminster Quarters every quarter hour in the key of E-flat.

While this building houses a memorial carillon, it is primarily a conventional high-rise, contains classrooms for the University of Michigan's school of music, and houses offices for the department of musicology and ethnomusicology and for the University Musical Society.

The Burton Memorial Tower was designed by Albert Kahn, who also designed the William L. Clements Library, Angell Hall, and Hill Auditorium for the University of Michigan. Its carillon was donated by Michigan alumnus Charles A. Baird, a lawyer and the first U-M athletic director, and has been christened the "Charles Baird Carillon". Baird had the bells cast in England and gave them to the university. He also commissioned “Sunday Morning in Deep Waters”, the fountain on Ingalls Mall between Burton Tower and the Michigan League.

After University of Michigan Regent Sarah Goddard Power committed suicide by jumping to her death from the eighth floor of Burton Tower in 1987, slight modifications were made to the structure, such as the addition of stops to prevent windows from opening more than a few inches.

The University of Michigan campus has two of only twenty-three grand carillons in the world, barely two miles apart. The other is housed at the Ann and Robert H. Lurie Tower on the North Campus.

On April 8, 2017, in celebration of the university's bicentennial, the tower was illuminated in maize and blue, the university's colors. The carillon and spire can also be lit in other colors by the LED illumination system installed for the bicentennial.

Statistics

The tower
 Building height: 
 Tower specification:  x 7 inches square
 Floor area: 
 Designer: Albert Kahn
 Final cost (1936): $243,664.61
 Recent renovation cost: $1.8 million
 Construction date: 1935 to 1936
 Construction materials: reinforced concrete shell, faced with limestone
 Dedicated on: December 4, 1936
 Dedicated to: U-M President Marion Leroy Burton (Presidency 1920–1925)

Charles Baird Carillon
 Location: Atop the Burton Memorial Tower
 World position: Tied for fourth heaviest carillon in the world
 Technical Specification:
 No. of bells: 53
 Total weight 43 tons
 Largest bell: 12 tons; strikes every hour
 Smallest bell: 16.5 pounds
 Others: Bells are stationary, and only the clappers move via mechanical linkage
 Cast by: John Taylor Bellfoundry, in Loughborough, England, in 1936 and 1975
Current carillonist: Tiffany Ng

See also
 List of carillons in the United States

References

External links

Official site of the Charles Baird Carillon
Official site of the Burton Memorial Tower Lighting system
Burton Memorial Tower from The University Record (November 5, 2001)
 Historical Records from the University of Michigan Regents' Proceedings
 
 
 
 Burton Tower: Interviews with carillonneurs Percival Price (1901-1985)  and  William De Turk

1936 establishments in Michigan
Albert Kahn (architect) buildings
Art Deco architecture in Michigan
Bell towers in the United States
Carillons
Clock towers in Michigan
Skyscrapers in Ann Arbor, Michigan
Skyscraper office buildings in Michigan
Towers completed in 1936
Towers in Michigan
University of Michigan campus